Pierro (foaled 5 October 2009) was an Australian racehorse who is now retired and standing at stud. A bay horse, he stands at 16.1hh. He was from the fifth crop of the champion racehorse and stallion Lonhro out of the dam Miss Rite Note (IRE)(by Daylami). Pierro had a short racing career, racing in just two seasons and retiring to stud as a three-year-old. He ran in a total of 14 races, with 11 wins and 3 placings, including 5 Group 1 wins. His distances ranged from 1200m to 2040m. He was bred at Musk Creek Farm and sold for $230,000 in the Magic Millions sale. He was an unbeaten Triple Crown winner at 2 years, and a dual Group 1 winner at 3 years, earning him the title of both the highest rated Australian juvenile since 1977, and the highest rated 3yo sprinter in the world in 2013.  
He is now retired to stud at Coolmore, in Jerrys Plains of NSW, where he was purchased for $40 million. This has proved to be a very worthwhile investment for Coolmore thus far, as has had an illustrious career as a stallion to date, including four Group 1 winning progeny. He has had progeny sell for up to $1.1 million, highlighting the promising nature of his progeny for the years to come. His stud fee of $88,000 reflects his high quality characteristics on sale to any buyer who has a worthwhile mare and can afford the fee. 

Pierro also had a race named after him in 2018, the 2YO Pierro Plate. It is an 1100m race, and it is run at Royal Randwick in the middle of February, and is a lead up race for the Golden Slipper.

Racing career

Two-year-old season: 2011–2012 
Pierro began his undefeated two-year-old season in the AJC Breeders' Plate in October 2011. He had a 5-month break before resuming in the Group 2 Silver Slipper Stakes, which he won. He then ran in the Group 2 Spotless Todman Stakes, which secured him a place in the Group 1 Golden Slipper. Pierro started the slipper as a $6.50 chance, with the favourite Samaready coming in third to Pierro. With a convincing win in the slipper, his record went to four unbeaten starts, making him the champion two-year-old colt of the season.

From here, Pierro went on to run in the Group 1 Inglis Sires Produce Stakes, where he started as second favourite behind the also unbeaten colt All Too Hard, where he notched up another win for itself. The last race of his season, the Group 1 Moet & Chandon Champagne Stakes, where he started as $1.22 favourite, as both bookies and punters had realised the true magic of the horse that was Pierro. He finished this with another win, finishing off his unbeaten two-year-old season. This incredible season had racing fans excited for the future of this horse, as an unprecedented 6 wins from 6 starts in very competitive races is no mean feat. This season was an incredible one for Pierro, attaining the "Triple Crown"  for two-year-olds.

Three-year-old season: 2012–2013 
After the champagne stakes, Pierro was spelled for 5 months before resuming with the Run to the Rose at Rosehill. Starting as a $1.53 favourite, it was no surprise that Pierro added yet another win to his record. Following this, it was decided that he would be sent to Victoria, in the hopes of winning either the Caulfield Guineas or the Cox Plate, both races longer in distance compared to his usual race length. The first Victoria race Pierro raced in was the City Jeep Bill Stutt Stakes at Moonee Valley, a Group 2 race which he won after starting as a $1.06 favourite. Following this was the Guineas, and with the step up in distance Pierro couldn't quite get there and managed a second place in this race. It was then back to the Valley for Pierro to have a run in the Cox Plate. A big step up in distance from his usual sprinting distances up to the 2040m distance. Proving too much for the horse, he still ran a convincing third, an admirable achievement for a sprinting horse.

After the Victoria trip Pierro was sent back to NSW for a spell in preparation for the Sydney Autumn Carnival, one, which like his two-year-old season, he would dominate. Another 5-month spell proved ideal for Pierro, and he returned fresh in the Group 2 Hobartville Stakes with a win back at his usual distance. It was then on to the Cellarbrations Cantebury Stakes, with another Group 1 win under his belt. He then geared up for the prestigious George Ryder Stakes, where as the $1.36 favourite he won yet again. Pierro's final race was the famous BMW Doncaster. The heavy track and slightly longer distance was too much for the colt, with Pierro running a second to Sacred Falls. Following this, the owners decided to retire Pierro and pursue a career as a stallion for the champion colt. He was then sold to Coolmore stud, in a deal rumoured to be worth $30 million.

Race record

Stud record 
After his retirement from racing, Pierro was sent to Coolmore stud to begin his career as a stallion. His stud fee of $88,000 for 2019 is a reflection of the incredible success his progeny have produced. He is the 3rd most expensive stallion currently stood at Coolmore in Australia. He has produced some incredibly successful progeny, with four Group 1 winning progeny already under his name. He has sold yearlings for up to $1.1 million, an incredible amount of money and a testament to his success so far.

His first crop of progeny began running in 2017, with 3 Group 1 winning horses coming out of this crop. His most successful progeny include Levendi, who is a multiple winner including the Group 1 Australian Derby and the Group 2 Tulloch Stakes, Arcadia Queen, who won the Group 1 Kingston Town Classic and Group 2 West Australian Guineas, or the rising sprinting star Pierata, who won the Group 1 All Aged Stakes, and was runner up in both the Group 1 Randwick Guineas and Group 1 Galaxy Handicap. Pierata is also locked in for the 2019 Everest, with the hopes of winning the $14 million prizemoney. With only three crops currently racing, it is promising to see how his progeny will run in the future. It was also announced that Aquis Farm has purchased a controlling stake in Pierata, meaning that he will soon be retired and go into stud duties himself. Arcadia Queen is also looking like a potential runner for the Everest, with her recently being sent over from Western Australia back to NSW in the Chris Waller stable in order to prepare for The Everest.

He has also had some success in the lower Grouped races, including a 2 Group 2 winners, in Action and Additional Power, and 3 Group 3 winners. Additionally, he has had success in the northern hemisphere, including winners in two "listed races" (Group 1) in Hong Kong, through the highly regarded horse Furore, who won both the Hong Kong Derby and the Hong Kong Classic Mile. Success overseas has been paramount to his increased stud fees, as it shows his progeny can take on some of the best across the world.

In total so far, he has produced 143 winners out of 241 starters, with those winners attaining earnings of over $21 Million.

Group 1 winners

Statistics 
At retirement, Pierro's record stood at 14 starts for 11 wins, 2 seconds, and one third. His longest winning streak was 8 in a row, and had a second winning streak of 3 in a row, before retiring on a second placing in the Doncaster. He had a winning strike rate of 78.6%, and a place rate of 100%. He is the highest rated Australian juvenile since 1977, and was the highest-rated 3yo sprinter in the world in 2013.

Pedigree 
Pierro has a very strong pedigree line, thanks to his sire Lonhro, who was also a champion racehorse. Daylami's line also been traditionally strong, producing multiple Group 1 winners over time Additionally to this, having a line free of Danehill makes him attractive to many mares who have his blood, preventing too much crossbreeding as Danehill has had many strong mares over time.

See also 

 List of millionaire racehorses in Australia
 Coolmore Stud
 Gai Waterhouse

References 

Australian racehorses
2009 racehorse births
Racehorses trained in Australia
Thoroughbred family 1-t